The 2013–14 George Mason Patriots men's basketball team represented George Mason University during the 2013–14 NCAA Division I men's basketball season. This was the 48th season for the program. The Patriots, led by third year head coach Paul Hewitt, played their inaugural season in the Atlantic 10 Conference (A-10), after spending the past 28 years in the Colonial Athletic Association (CAA). They finished the season 11–20, 4–12 in A-10 play to finish in 12th place. They lost in the first round of the A-10 tournament to Fordham.

Offseason

Departures

Awards

Roster

Stats

Schedule and results

|-
!colspan=12 style=| Non-conference regular season

|-
!colspan=12 style=|<span style=>Atlantic 10 regular season

|-
!colspan=12 style=|Atlantic 10 tournament

Recruiting
The following is a list of players signed for the 2014–15 season:

References

George Mason Patriots men's basketball seasons
George Mason
George Mason
George Mason